List of Guggenheim Fellowships awarded in 2019: Guggenheim Fellowships have been awarded annually since 1925, by the John Simon Guggenheim Memorial Foundation to those "who have demonstrated exceptional capacity for productive scholarship or exceptional creative ability in the arts." The John Simon Guggenheim Memorial Foundation approved the awarding of 168 Guggenheim Fellowships, chosen from a group of almost 3,000 applicants in the Foundation’s ninety-fifth competition.

References

2019
2019 awards
Articles with tables in need of attention
2019 art awards